Ekdahl is a surname of Swedish origin which may refer to:

Jonas Ekdahl, Swedish born drummer of metal band Evergrey  
Lennart Ekdahl (1912–2005), Swedish sailor who competed in the 1936 Summer Olympics
Lisa Ekdahl (born 1971), Swedish singer-songwriter 
Nils Johan Ekdahl  (1799–1870), Swedish theologian, political writer and cultural historian

Swedish-language surnames